Toyota Concept Vehicles produced between 1980 and 1989 include:

HiLux RV-3 (1980)

The Toyota HiLux RV-3 is a concept vehicle made by Toyota in 1980. It entered production as the third generation Hilux.

DV-1 (1981)
The Toyota DV-1 was introduced in 1981. It is a Welcab style, and was shown at the Tokyo Motor Show. The car is designed for individuals with severe upper extremity disabilities. Based on the Toyota Corolla 1500SE passenger car, the DV-1 has been modified so that operations normally performed by the hands can be performed instead by other parts of the body. For example, the doors can be opened and closed with the feet. The car can be steered with the left leg. The shift lever, switches, parking brake and other devices can be operated with the right leg and right shoulder, and the turn signal switch with the head. The fully automatic air conditioner and radio respond to spoken commands. The latest Toyota technical advances are located throughout the DV-1. These include remote control door lock/unlock, automatic seatbelts, vehicle-speed-responsive door lock, headlights with automatic on/off and high and low beam use control, and "run flat tires" which can be driven on for short distances after punctures.

EX-11 (1981)

The Toyota EX-11 was a concept vehicle by Toyota shown at the 1981 Tokyo Motor Show.
Based on the prototype Soarer, the EX-11 demonstrated advance electronics such as electronic engine and drive train management, colour monitors and fibre optic wiring.

SV-2 (1981)

The Toyota SV-2 was a concept vehicle by Toyota shown at the 1981 Tokyo Motor Show.
Based on the second-generation Supra, the SV-2 featured different styling, complete with a removable targa top and a maroon and white interior.

RV-5 (1982)

The Toyota RV-5 was a concept vehicle by Toyota shown at the Jan 1982 Tokyo Auto Salon and the March 1983 Geneva Motor Show.
Based on the upcoming 4WD Tercel L20, the RV-5 was configured as a cross country mobile camera platform. The RV-5 was close to the released 4WD Tercel, with the main difference being that the large rear, side windows on the RV-5 could hinge upwards.

CQ-1 (1983)
The Toyota CQ-1 was produced in 1983, and was based on the Toyota TownAce. The CQ-1 was a concept in automobile communications technology; meaning the vehicle boasted advanced technology for the 1980s.

Palette, Y-1, Y-2, Y-3 (1983)

The Toyota Palette was a concept vehicle made by Toyota in 1983. The Palette Y-2 was created in 1987, at the Tokyo Motor Show. The Y-2 was renamed the Toyota AXV-II. The Palette Y-3 was introduced in 1990, and was renamed the Toyota Sera.

SV-3 (1983)

The SV-3 was a concept vehicle by Toyota shown at the 1983 Tokyo Motor Show. With minor changes it was put into production as the Toyota MR2.

FX-1 (1983)

The FX-1 was a concept car by Toyota.
It was first shown at the 1983 Tokyo Motor Show and also shown at the Geneva Motor Show in March 1984.
It was a showcase for new technologies in driver controls, engine, suspension, materials and aerodynamics. Design cues from the FX-1 later ended up on the Toyota Camry XV20, built between 1996 and 2001.

TAC3 (1983)

The TAC3 was a 4WD concept car by Toyota, first shown at the 1983 Tokyo Motor Show. The driver sat in a central position, while two passengers sat behind in separate bucket seats. There was no roof but a rear roll bar provided roll over protection. The TAC3 was shown with a small trailer that also held 4 spare tyres on its towing arm.

AXV (1985)

The AXV (Advanced Experimental Vehicle) was a concept vehicle by Toyota that was first shown at the October 1985 Tokyo Motor Show. Its goal was for ultra-low fuel consumption, to be under 650 kg in weight and to have the same interior volume as a small sedan.

The bonnet, rear suspension arms and wheel rims were made from SMC (Sheet Moulding Compound), the roof was made from resin between steel sheets and the windows were made from polycarbonate resin.

The engine was a 1.1 litre 3 cylinder diesel. It used turbo-charging, direct injection and electronics to keep high performance levels while maintaining low fuel consumption.

FXV (1985)

The FXV (Future eXperimental Vehicle) was a concept vehicle by Toyota that was first shown at the 1985 Tokyo Motor Show.

The FXV included both 4 wheel steering and 4 wheel drive with Electronic Skid Control.

The mid-mounted 2.0 L engine had both a supercharger and a turbocharger (with a ceramic turbine wheel), pistons made from magnesium fibre-reinforced metal (FRM), a distributor-less ignition system and a resin intake manifold.

The full colour computerised CRT displays had touch screens which could control the suspension, CD player, air conditioning, cellular phone and 8mm video display. Speed was projected onto a head-up display.

MR2 Group B Prototype (1987)

Toyota's MR2 Group B Prototype was introduced in 1987. It was based on the Toyota 222D, but with added rally features, and is RWD.

GTV (1987)

The Toyota GTV (Gas Turbine Vehicle) was a concept vehicle by Toyota with a gas turbine engine.
It was first shown at the October 1987 Tokyo Motor Show.

A very sophisticated concept vehicle, it was based on the Toyota Carina, and was in fact a proof of concept vehicle slated initially for small-scale production.

A measure of Toyota's intent with the vehicle was its allowing journalists from Car Magazine to review the vehicle in 1986. Their view was favourable with regard to the overall performance of the vehicle, although the natural turbine lag of the engine did hurt the overall impression of the review. The CVT automatic gearbox did however endear the vehicle to testers - this gearbox has now become the cornerstone of Toyota automatic gearboxes, and the basis of the Toyota Prius gearbox. The GTV was also reviewed by Popular Science magazine.

The GTV used the Gas Turbine II engine. A one-stage turbine was used to drive the compressor while a second turbine was connected to the drive shaft. The second stage also took the place of the fluid flywheel (torque converter). Unlike the earlier Chrysler Turbine Car, the GTV had a de-coupled gas turbine (i.e. output was by a separate turbine) with a two-stage heat exchanger designed to reduce the exhaust gas temperature. The compressor turbine spun at up to 68,000 rpm while the output turbine spun at up to 65,000 rpm. A regenerator took waste heat and transferred it to the incoming air, increasing efficiency.

Earlier versions of the Gas Turbine engine were shown at the Tokyo Motor Show in 1975 (in the Toyota Century)

and 1977 (free standing).

AXV-II (1987)

The AXV-II was a concept car built by Toyota that was first shown at the October 1987 Tokyo Motor Show.

The concept has butterfly doors and pivoted up to the front to allow passengers to exit from the car in places that ordinary conventional doors cannot handle. Gas filled struts kept the door in place when open. The doors covered the roof of the car as well as the sides, with the door glass forming part of the roof.

The hatchback was made entirely from glass that included the rear sides of the vehicle in a similar manner to the early Mazda RX-7.

Mechanical components (engine, gearbox, suspension) were the same as those in the Starlet.

The AXV-II went into production as the Toyota Sera in March 1990.

FXV-II (1987)

The FXV-II (Future eXperimental Vehicle II) was a concept vehicle by Toyota that was first shown at the October 1987 Tokyo Motor Show.

It had an all alloy, quad cam, 32 valve, EFI, 3.8 litre V8 engine. It used a prototype of the 1UZ-FE which was later used in the Lexus LS400 (some 1UZ-FE prototypes from about 1987 were the same size). The radiator cooling fans were hydraulically driven under computer control.

At the time, the drive train was Toyota's only 4WD system using a V8.
The front/rear split was normally 30/70 but could change up to 50/50. A 4 speed electronically controlled automatic gearbox was used.
Electronic Skid Control and Traction Control were included.

The Pegasus (Precision Engineered Geometrically Advanced SUSpension) was a prototype for the new Toyota TEMS suspension used on later Cressidas, Soarers and Supras.

The interior included GPS navigation and computerised CRT displays.

Images of FXV-II

EV-30 (1987)

The EV-30 was a concept two-seat electric vehicle by Toyota that was first shown at the October 1987 Tokyo Motor Show.
.

Th body was made from resin and was shown in both open (no roof) and closed (with a roof) forms, although both forms had no doors. The front bumper sloped back and upwards, running into the cabin to form the dashboard. The rear bumper sloped forward and down, running into the cabin to form the side armrests. The construction was lightweight, being designed as a LSV for use inside shopping malls, hospitals and similar environments.

Zinc-bromide batteries of 106 V were used to power an AC induction motor. The batteries could be charged from a standard Japanese 100 V mains socket.

Soarer Aero Cabin (1987)

The Toyota Soarer Aero Cabin (Aerocabin) is a sports car based on the Toyota Soarer, and produced in 1987. It is a Japan only model, and 500 were produced. It is estimated that 490 are still in good condition. It includes an electric folding roof, power windows, power locks, leather seats, folding mirrors, keyless entry, digital dash, cruise control, and automated climate control. It's emblem is a horse with wings.

4500GT (1989)

The Toyota 4500GT concept debuted at the 1989 Frankfurt Motor Show.  It is a 2-door, 2+2 coupe that signalled Toyota's entry into the competitive upper-level luxury coupe class. Although the car's controversial styling was almost universally disliked by the show-goers at the Frankfurt show, its mechanical components were far more relevant, as they carried over much more closely to its production offspring than the styling did.

To achieve this, the car had to be both efficient, and powerful.

The power plant was quite impressive. A derivative of Toyota's then-new 1UZ-FE V8, the 4500GT boasted an additional 500 cc of displacement over the production unit, twin overhead camshafts per cylinder bank, and 5 valves per cylinder. This alloy V8 was mated with a 6 speed manual transmission, which was mounted at the rear with the differential to even out the front/rear weight balance.

The suspension used double control arms front and rear.  The front utilized upper A arms and lower L arms, and the rear used upper L arms and lower A arms for increased camber to promote stability in high speed corners.

The 4500GT never made it directly to the showroom; however, it was the predecessor to the third generation Toyota Soarer (also known as the first generation Lexus SC). The styling of the Soarer/SC400 was in the eyes of many much more cohesive and attractive, and it went on to great commercial success on the mechanical backbone of the 4500GT concept.

Camp Mate (1989)

The Toyota Camp Mate is a RV based on the Toyota LiteAce (TownAce). The concept was introduced in 1989, and was only . It features the regular LiteAce body, but includes a expandable side, adding an additional  of space inside. The Camp Mate can fit up to 10 people, and has room for 2 beds, a small kitchen, a living room, and 1 bathroom. It is powered by the 2C 2.0 litre diesel engine, and uses 4WD.

RAV-Four (1989)

The Toyota RAV-Four is a concept vehicle produced by Toyota in 1989, and shown at the Tokyo Motor Show. It entered production as the Toyota RAV4. In the front, it includes a retractable winch.

See also
Toyota concept vehicles (1935–1969)
Toyota concept vehicles (1970–1979)
Toyota concept vehicles (1990–1999)
Toyota concept vehicles (2000–2009)
Toyota concept vehicles (2010–2019)
Toyota concept vehicles (2020–2029)

References

External links
 Toyota concept cars
 Video of the GTV on Youtube

1980-1989